Joaquín 'Ximo' Forner Martín de Ojeda (born 27 January 1990 in Almenara, Castellón, Valencian Community) is a Spanish professional footballer who plays for Atlético Saguntino as a midfielder.

International career
Forner was a member of the Spanish squad in the 2007 UEFA European Under-17 Football Championship.

External links

1990 births
Living people
People from Plana Baixa
Sportspeople from the Province of Castellón
Spanish footballers
Footballers from the Valencian Community
Association football midfielders
Segunda División B players
Tercera División players
Valencia CF Mestalla footballers
CD Alcoyano footballers
Polideportivo Ejido footballers
Real Balompédica Linense footballers
CD Castellón footballers
Atlético Saguntino players
Football League (Greece) players
Athlitiki Enosi Larissa F.C. players
Spanish expatriate footballers
Expatriate footballers in Greece
Spanish expatriate sportspeople in Greece